The FIDE Women's Grand Prix 2011–12 was a series of six chess tournaments exclusively for women, which formed part of the qualification cycle for the Women's World Chess Championship 2013. The winner of the Grand Prix, Hou Yifan, will challenge the 2012 Women's World Chess champion.

Format
18 top world women players were to be selected to compete in these tournaments. Each player agrees and will contract to participate in exactly four of these tournaments. Players must rank their preference of tournaments once the final list of host cities is announced and the dates are allocated to each host city.

Each tournament is a 12-player, single round-robin tournament. In each round players scored 1 point for a win, ½ point for a draw and 0 for a loss. Grand prix points were then allocated according to each player's standing in the tournament: 160 grand prix points for first place, 130 for second place, 110 for third place, and then 90 down to 10 points by steps of 10. In case of a tie in points the grand prix points are shared evenly by the tied players.
Players only counted their best three tournament results. The player with the most grand prix points is the winner.

Players and qualification
There were several ways to qualify for the Grand Prix series.

The top four from the Women's World Chess Championship 2010:
Hou Yifan, Ruan Lufei, Koneru Humpy, and Zhao Xue.
The winner of the previous Grand Prix
(As Hou Yifan was already qualified an additional sixth rating entry was given)
The six highest rated players (average of July 2010 and January 2011 lists) not already qualified:
Judit Polgár (declined), Tatiana Kosintseva, Antoaneta Stefanova, Nadezhda Kosintseva, Anna Muzychuk, and Kateryna Lahno.
Two players nominated by the FIDE president:
Zhu Chen and Batkhuyag Munguntuul.
One nominee from each of the six host cities:
Ekaterina Kovalevskaya (Rostov), Ju Wenjun (Shenzhen), Alexandra Kosteniuk (Nalchik), Alisa Galliamova (Kazan), Elina Danielian (Jermuk), and Betul Cemre Yildiz (Istanbul).

Polgár, the highest rated woman in the world, has never competed for the women's title and declined to participate in this cycle as well, so her spot was given to the next player on the average rating list, Viktorija Cmilyte.

At the second tournament in Shenzhen, Tan Zhongyi replaced Alisa Galliamova.

Prize money and Grand Prix points
The prize fund was €40,000 per Grand Prix event and €60,000 for the overall Grand Prix placement.

Tie breaks
With the objective of determining a clear, single winner to play in the Challenger Match and in the case that two or more players have equal cumulative points at the top, the following criteria (in descending order) will be utilized to decide the overall winner:
 The fourth result not already in the top three performances
 The number of actual game points scored in the four tournaments
 The number of first-place finishes
 The number of second-place finishes
 The number of won games
 Drawing of lots

Results

The six tournaments were:

Events crosstables

{| class="wikitable" style="text-align: center;"
|+ Rostov, August 2011
|-
! !! !! Rating !! 1 !! 2 !! 3 !! 4 !! 5 !! 6 !! 7 !! 8 !! 9 !! 10 !! 11 !! 12 !! Score !! Tie break
|-
| 1  || align=left| Hou Yifan || 2575 || – || 0 || 1 || ½ || ½ || 1 || 1 || ½ || 1 || ½ || 1 || 1 || 8 || 
|-
| 2  || align=left| Kateryna Lahno || 2536 || 1 || – || 0 || ½ || 1 || ½ || 1 || 1 || 1 || 0 || ½ || ½ || 7 || 
|-
| 3  || align=left| Anna Muzychuk || 2538 || 0 || 1 || – || ½ || ½ || ½ || 1 || ½ || ½ || 1 || ½ || ½ || 6½ || 34.25
|-
| 4  || align=left| Tatiana Kosintseva || 2557 || ½ || ½ || ½ || – || ½ || ½ || 0 || 1 || ½ || 1 || 1 || ½ || 6½ || 33.50
|-
| 5  || align=left| Nadezhda Kosintseva || 2560 || ½ || 0 || ½ || ½ || – || ½ || ½ || ½ || ½ || ½ || 1 || 1 || 6 || 
|-
| 6  || align=left| Koneru Humpy || 2614 || 0 || ½ || ½ || ½ || ½ || – || ½ || ½ || ½ || 1 || 0 || 1 || 5½ || 28.25
|-
| 7  || align=left| Alisa Galliamova || 2492 || 0 || 0 || 0 || 1 || ½ || ½ || – || 1 || 0 || 1 || 1 || ½ || 5½ || 26.75
|-
| 8  || align=left| Antoaneta Stefanova || 2524 || ½ || 0 || ½ || 0 || ½ || ½ || 0 || – || 1 || ½ || 1 || ½ || 5 || 25.25
|-
| 9  || align=left| Elina Danielian || 2521 || 0 || 0 || ½ || ½ || ½ || ½ || 1 || 0 || – || 0 || 1 || 1 || 5 || 24.25
|-
| 10 || align=left| Ruan Lufei || 2479 || ½ || 1 || 0 || 0 || ½ || 0 || 0 || ½ || 1 || – || ½ || ½ || 4½ || 
|-
| 11 || align=left| Ekaterina Kovalevskaya || 2427 || 0 || ½ || ½ || 0 || 0 || 1 || 0 || 0 || 0 || ½ || – || 1 || 3½ || 
|-
| 12 || align=left| Alexandra Kosteniuk || 2497 || 0 || ½ || ½ || ½ || 0 || 0 || ½ || ½ || 0 || ½ || 0 || – || 3 || 
|}

{| class="wikitable" style="text-align: center;"
|+ Shenzhen, September 2011
|-
! !! !! Rating !! 1 !! 2 !! 3 !! 4 !! 5 !! 6 !! 7 !! 8 !! 9 !! 10 !! 11 !! 12 !! Score !! Tie break
|-
| 1  || align=left| Hou Yifan || 2578 || – || ½ || ½ || 1 || ½ || 1 || 1 || ½ || ½ || 1 || 1 || ½ || 8 || 
|-
| 2  || align=left| Anna Muzychuk || 2545 || ½ || – || ½ || ½ || ½ || ½ || ½ || 1 || ½ || 1 || ½ || 1 || 7 || 
|-
| 3  || align=left| Ju Wenjun || 2536 || ½ || ½ || – || ½ || 1 || ½ || ½ || 0 || 1 || ½ || ½ || 1 || 6½ || 33.75
|-
| 4  || align=left| Tan Zhongyi || 2429 || 0 || ½ || ½ || – || ½ || ½ || ½ || ½ || ½ || 1 || 1 || 1 || 6½ || 31.25
|-
| 5  || align=left| Zhao Xue || 2497 || ½ || ½ || 0 || ½ || – || 1 || 1 || 0 || ½ || ½ || ½ || 1 || 6 || 31.25
|-
| 6  || align=left| Ruan Lufei || 2477 || 0 || ½ || ½ || ½ || 0 || – || ½ || 1 || ½ || ½ || 1 || 1 || 6 || 28.75
|-
| 7  || align=left| Batkhuyagiin Möngöntuul || 2465 || 0 || ½ || ½ || ½ || 0 || ½ || – || 0 || 1 || 1 || ½ || 1 || 5½ || 
|-
| 8  || align=left| Elina Danielian || 2517 || ½ || 0 || 1 || ½ || 1 || 0 || 1 || – || 0 || 0 || ½ || ½ || 5 || 
|-
| 9  || align=left| Zhu Chen || 2490 || ½ || ½ || 0 || ½ || ½ || ½ || 0 || 1 || – || 0 || ½ || ½ || 4½ || 25.00
|-
| 10 || align=left| Viktorija Cmilyte || 2525 || 0 || 0 || ½ || 0 || ½ || ½ || 0 || 1 || 1 || – || ½ || ½ || 4½ || 22.00
|-
| 11 || align=left| Ekaterina Kovalevskaya || 2421 || 0 || ½ || ½ || 0 || ½ || 0 || ½ || ½ || ½ || ½ || – || ½ || 4 || 
|-
| 12 || align=left| Betul Cemre Yildiz || 2308 || ½ || 0 || 0 || 0 || 0 || 0 || 0 || ½ || ½ || ½ || ½ || – || 2½ || 
|}

{| class="wikitable" style="text-align: center;"
|+ Nalchik, October 2011
|-
! !! !! Rating !! 1 !! 2 !! 3 !! 4 !! 5 !! 6 !! 7 !! 8 !! 9 !! 10 !! 11 !! 12 !! Score !! Tie break
|-
| 1  || align=left| Zhao Xue || 2497 || – || 0 || ½ || 1 || 1 || 1 || 1 || 1 || 1 || 1 || 1 || 1 || 9½ || 
|-
| 2  || align=left| Ju Wenjun || 2536 || 1 || – || ½ || ½ || ½ || 1 || ½ || 1 || 1 || ½ || 0 || ½ || 7 || 
|-
| 3  || align=left| Ekaterina Kovalevskaya || 2421 || ½ || ½ || – || 1 || ½ || ½ || ½ || 1 || ½ || ½ || ½ || 0 || 6 || 33.75
|-
| 4  || align=left| Viktorija Cmilyte || 2525 || 0 || ½ || 0 || – || 1 || ½ || 1 || ½ || ½ || ½ || ½ || 1 || 6 || 29.25
|-
| 5  || align=left| Kateryna Lahno || 2554 || 0 || ½ || ½ || 0 || – || ½ || ½ || ½ || 1 || ½ || ½ || 1 || 5½ || 
|-
| 6  || align=left| Zhu Chen || 2490 || 0 || 0 || ½ || ½ || ½ || – || ½ || ½ || 1 || ½ || 1 || 0 || 5 || 25.00
|-
| 7  || align=left| Tatiana Kosintseva || 2536 || 0 || ½ || ½ || 0 || ½ || ½ || – || ½ || ½ || ½ || ½ || 1 || 5 || 24.50
|-
| 8  || align=left| Nadezhda Kosintseva || 2560 || 0 || 0 || 0 || ½ || ½ || ½ || ½ || – || ½ || ½ || 1 || 1 || 5 || 23.00
|-
| 9  || align=left| Antoaneta Stefanova || 2528 || 0 || 0 || ½ || ½ || 0 || 0 || ½ || ½ || – || 1 || 1 || 1 || 5 || 23.00
|-
| 10 || align=left| Alisa Galliamova || 2498 || 0 || ½ || ½ || ½ || ½ || ½ || ½ || ½ || 0 || – || 1 || 0 || 4½ || 
|-
| 11 || align=left| Batkhuyagiin Möngöntuul || 2465 || 0 || 1 || ½ || ½ || ½ || 0 || ½ || 0 || 0 || 0 || – || 1 || 4 || 
|-
| 12 || align=left| Alexandra Kosteniuk || 2469 || 0 || ½ || 1 || 0 || 0 || 1 || 0 || 0 || 0 || 1 || 0 || – || 3½ || 
|}

{| class="wikitable" style="text-align: center;"
|+ Kazan, June 2012
|-
! !! !! Rating !! 1 !! 2 !! 3 !! 4 !! 5 !! 6 !! 7 !! 8 !! 9 !! 10 !! 11 !! 12 !! Score !! Tie break
|-
| 1  || align=left| Koneru Humpy || 2589 || – || ½ || ½ || ½ || ½ || ½ || ½ || 1 || 1 || ½ || 1 || 1 || 7½ || 36.75
|-
| 2  || align=left| Anna Muzychuk || 2598|| ½ || – || ½ || ½ || ½ || ½ || ½ || ½ || 1 || 1 || 1 || 1 || 7½ || 36.50
|-
| 3  || align=left| Viktorija Cmilyte || 2508|| ½ || ½ || – || 1 || 0 || ½ || ½ || ½ || ½ || 1 || 1 || 1 || 7 || 35.00
|-
| 4  || align=left| Hou Yifan || 2623 || ½ || ½ || 0 || – || 1 || 1 || 1 || ½ || 1 || ½ || 1 || 0 || 7 || 37.25
|-
| 5  || align=left| Alexandra Kosteniuk || 2457 || ½ || ½ || 1 || 0 || – || 1 || ½ || 0 || ½ || 0 || 1 || 1 || 6 || 31.00
|-
| 6  || align=left| Elina Danielian || 2484 || ½ || ½ || ½ || 0 || 0 || – || 1 || 1 || ½ || 1 || 0 || 1 || 6 || 30.75
|-
| 7  || align=left| Tatiana Kosintseva || 2532 || ½ || ½ || ½ || 0 || ½ || 0 || – || 1 || ½ || ½ || ½ || 1 || 5½ || 
|-
| 8  || align=left| Kateryna Lahno || 2546|| 0 || ½ || ½ || ½ || 1 || 0 || 0 || – || ½ || ½ || 1 || ½ || 5 || 
|-
| 9  || align=left| Antoaneta Stefanova || 2518|| 0 || 0 || ½ || 0 || ½ || ½ || ½ || ½ || – || 1 || ½ || ½ || 4½ || 22
|-
| 10 || align=left| Nadezhda Kosintseva || 2528|| ½ || 0 || 0 || ½ || 1 || 0 || ½ || ½ || 0 || – || 1 || ½ || 4½ || 22.75
|-
| 11 || align=left| Alisa Galliamova || 2484|| 0 || 0 || 0 || 0 || 0 || 1 || ½ || 0 || ½ || 0 || – || 1 || 3 || 
|-
| 12 || align=left| Betul Cemre Yildiz || 2333|| 0 || 0 || 0 || 1 || 0 || 0 || 0 || ½ || ½ || ½ || 0 || – || 2½ || 
|}

{| class="wikitable" style="text-align: center;"
|+ Jermuk, July 2012
|-
! !! !! Rating !! 1 !! 2 !! 3 !! 4 !! 5 !! 6 !! 7 !! 8 !! 9 !! 10 !! 11 !! 12 !! Score !! Tie break
|-
| 1  || align=left|  Hou Yifan || 2617 || – || ½ || 0 || ½ || ½ || 1 || ½ || ½ || 1 || 1 || ½ || 1 || 7 || 
|-
| 2  || align=left| Nadezhda Kosintseva || 2516 || ½ || – || ½ || 1 || ½ || 1 || 1 || 1 || 0 || 0 || ½ || ½ || 6½  || 36.50
|-
| 3  || align=left| Kateryna Lahno || 2537|| 1 || ½ || – || 1 || ½ || ½ || 0 || ½ || ½ || 1 || ½ || ½ || 6½ || 36.00
|-
| 4  || align=left| Koneru Humpy || 2598 || ½ || 0 || 0 || – || 1 || ½ || 1 || 0 || 1 || 1 || ½ || 1 || 6½ || 33.00
|-
| 5  || align=left| Ju Wenjun || 2518 || ½ || ½ || ½ || 0 || – || 1 || 0 || 1 || ½ || ½ || ½ || 1 || 6 || 31.25
|-
| 6  || align=left| Ruan Lufei  || 2483 || 0 || 0 || ½ || ½ || 0 || – || 1 || ½ || 1 || ½ || 1 || 1 || 6 || 29.25
|-
| 7  || align=left| Zhao Xue  || 2556 || ½ || 0 || 1 || 0 || 1 || 0 || – || ½ || 1 || 0 || ½ || 1 || 5½ || 
|-
| 8  || align=left| Elina Danielian || 2480 || ½ || 0 || ½ || 1 || 0 || ½ || ½ || – || ½ || ½ || ½ || ½ || 5 || 27.50
|-
| 9  || align=left| Lilit Mkrtchian || 2450|| 0 || 1 || ½ || 0 || ½ || 0 || 0 || ½ || – || 1 || ½ || 1 || 5 || 25.25
|-
| 10 || align=left| Ekaterina Kovalevskaya || 2417|| 0 || 1 || 0 || 0 || ½ || ½ || 1 || ½ || 0 || – || 1 || 0 || 4½ || 
|-
| 11 || align=left| Batkhuyagiin Möngöntuul || 2447 || ½ || ½ || ½ || ½ || ½ || 0 || ½ || ½ || ½ || 0 || – || 0 || 4 || 
|-
| 12 || align=left| Nino Khurtsidze || 2456 || 0 || ½ || ½ || 0 || 0 || 0 || 0 || ½ || 0 || 1 || 1 || – || 3½ || 
|}

{| class="wikitable" style="text-align: center;"
|+ Ankara, September 2012
|-
! !! !! Rating !! 1 !! 2 !! 3 !! 4 !! 5 !! 6 !! 7 !! 8 !! 9 !! 10 !! 11 !! 12 !! Score !! Tie break
|-
| 1  || align=left|  Koneru Humpy || 2593 || – || 0 || ½ || ½ || 1 || ½ || 1 || 1 || 1 || 1 || 1 || 1 || 8½ || 
|-
| 2  || align=left| Anna Muzychuk || 2606|| 1 || – || ½ || ½ || ½ || ½ || 1 || ½ || ½ || 1 || 1 || 1 || 8  || 
|-
| 3  || align=left| Zhao Xue || 2549 || ½ || ½ || – || 0 || ½ || 1 || ½ ||1 || 1 || 1 || 1 || ½ || 7½ || 
|-
| 4  || align=left| Viktorija Cmilyte || 2520|| ½ || ½|| 1|| – || ½|| ½ || 0|| ½|| 1 || 0|| 1|| 1 || 6½ || 33.50
|-
| 5  || align=left| Ruan Lufei || 2492|| 0|| ½ || ½ || ½ || – || ½ || ½ || ½ || ½ || 1|| 1|| 1 || 6½ || 29.50
|-
| 6  || align=left| Batkhuyagiin Möngöntuul  || 2434|| ½ || ½ || 0|| ½ || ½ || – || ½ || 1|| ½ || ½ || 1 || ½ || 6 || 
|-
| 7  || align=left| Tatiana Kosintseva  || 2524|| 0|| 0|| ½ || 1|| ½ || ½ || – || 1|| ½ || 0 || 1|| ½ || 5½ || 
|-
| 8  || align=left| Ju Wenjun || 2528 || 0|| ½ || 0|| ½ || ½ || 0 || 0 || – || 1 || 1 || ½ || 1 || 5 || 
|-
| 9  || align=left| Antoaneta Stefanova || 2502|| 0 || ½ || 0 || 0 || ½ || ½ || ½ || 0 || – || 1 || ½ || 1 || 4½ || 
|-
| 10 || align=left| Betul Cemre Yildiz || 2341|| 0 || 0 || 0 || 1 || 0 || ½ || 1 || 0 || 0 || – || ½ || ½ || 3½ || 
|-
| 11 || align=left| Monika Soćko || 2463 || 0 || 0 || 0 || 0 || 0 || 0 || 0 || ½ || ½ || ½ || – || 1 || 2½ || 
|-
| 12 || align=left| Kübra Öztürk || 2294|| 0 || 0 || ½ || 0 || 0 || ½ || ½ || 0 || 0 || ½ || 0 || – || 2|| 
|}

Grand Prix standings
Hou Yifan won the Grand Prix with a perfect score culminating with her third sole victory at the fifth Grand Prix in Jermuk and thus qualified her to face Anna Ushenina in the Women's World Chess Championship 2013. A score in italics denotes a score not being into account for the total as there are three better results for the player.

Notes: Tan Zhongyi replaced Alisa Galliamova in Shenzhen. Nino Khurtsidze and Lilit Mkrtchian replaced Alexandra Kosteniuk and Zhu Chen in Jermuk, who had withdrawn their participation.

See also
 FIDE Women's Grand Prix 2009–11, the previous cycle
 FIDE Women's Grand Prix 2013–14, the next cycle

References

External links
 

Women's chess competitions
2011 in chess
2012 in chess
FIDE Grand Prix